The Battle of Tepe (or Tebe) on 25 August 1914 was the first skirmish between German and British forces during the Kamerun campaign in of the First World War. The conflict took place on the border between British Nigeria and German Kamerun, ending in British victory and German withdrawal from the station.

Prelude
On 4 August 1914, Britain declared war on the German Empire at the beginning of the First World War. On 8 August, a mounted detachment from the West African Frontier Force embarked from Kano in northern British Nigeria towards the German colony of Kamerun. These first British forces crossed the border into German territory on 25 August.

Battle
British cavalry came into contact with German forces at the border station at Tepe on the Benue River on 25 August. After sharp fighting German forces withdrew and the British occupied the station. Few casualties resulted from the battle. The British occupation of the station gave their forces the opportunity to push further east to the German stronghold at Garua. The British were defeated in their attempt to take the forts there at the First Battle of Garua only days after the conflict at Tepe.

Notes

References
Buchan, John. A History of the Great War. Vol. I. Boston and New York: Houghton Mifflin, 1922
Reynolds, Francis J.,  Churchill, Allen L., and Miller, Francis T. "Chapter 77 - The Cameroons." "The Story of the Great War".  Vol. III (of VIII). 1916.

Battles of World War I involving Germany
Battles of World War I involving the United Kingdom
African theatre of World War I
Battles of the African Theatre (World War I)
Military history of Cameroon
Kamerun
Battles of the Kamerun campaign
Conflicts in 1914
1914 in Africa
August 1914 events
1910s in Kamerun